KZML (95.9 FM) is a radio station broadcasting a Regional Mexican format. Licensed to Quincy, Washington, United States, the station serves the Wenatchee  area. The station is currently owned by Amador and Rosalie Bustos, through licensee Bustos Media Holdings, LLC.

History
The station went on the air as KTRQ on 1996-06-07. On 1998-05-01, the station changed its call sign to KYAK. On 1998-06-12 to KGER. On 2001-10-29 to the current KZML.

Bustos Media used to own the station. In September 2010, Bustos transferred most of its licenses to Adelante Media Group as part of a settlement with its lenders.

Effective December 10, 2014, Bustos Media repurchased KZML and translator K225AR from Adelante Media, along with eight other stations, for $6 million.

References

External links

ZML
Radio stations established in 1996
1996 establishments in Washington (state)
Regional Mexican radio stations in the United States
Wenatchee, Washington